The Labour Emancipation League was a socialist organisation in London.

The origins of the league lay in the 1880 split from the National Secular Society of the Stratford Dialectical and Radical Club around Ambrose Barker. In 1881, the Club was forced to abandon its activities, although it remained in existence as the Homerton Socialist Society.

Barker and Tom Lemon from the Society joined with Joseph Lane and Frank Kitz to hold regular public meetings in Mile End. These proved a success, and they formed the Labour Emancipation League to continue this work. The first secretary, Aaron Moseley, soon resigned and was replaced by Lane.

The League was influenced by Marxism, Chartism and Proudhonism.  Its programme called for:

The League soon spread across the East End of London. In 1884, it joined H. M. Hyndman's Democratic Federation, which was consequently renamed the Social Democratic Federation and adopted much of the League's programme. However, in 1885 the East London branch of the SDF was one of several to split and form the Socialist League.

References

Bibliography
 

Defunct political parties in England
Political parties established in 1881
Political parties disestablished in 1884
Socialist parties in England
Defunct socialist parties in the United Kingdom
1881 establishments in England
1884 disestablishments in England
Mile End